Central is an MTR station located in the Central area of Hong Kong Island. The station's livery is firebrick red but brown on the  platforms.

The station was originally named Chater station. More than 200,000 passengers use this station daily. The longest distance between two exits is approximately 700m.

History

Early plans
Central station was included in the Hong Kong Mass Transport Study, a system proposed in September 1967. The station was originally planned to be located under Des Voeux Road Central between Jubilee Street and Pedder Street.

In 1970, in the Hong Kong Mass Transit Further Studies, the station was proposed as two separate but connected stations: Chater station under Chater Road and Pedder station under Pedder Street), which would serve the Kong Kow line (now Tsuen Wan line) and Island line respectively.

Modified Initial System and opening
The station first opened as Chater station on 12 February 1980 as the terminus of the Modified Initial System (MIS, now Kwun Tong line). Only a portion of the station came into operation as the Island line had not been opened yet.

The station was named Chater in English but 中環 (Central) in Chinese. This would be misleading as many thought that the Chinese name would be 遮打, a transliteration and the Chinese name of the namesake road. When the Island line between Admiralty and Chai Wan opened on 31 May 1985, MTR renamed Chater to Central together with the renaming of some other stations on the Kwun Tong and Tsuen Wan lines.

Construction for the Island line was carried out in early 1983 and connected the new platforms with the original structure. The Island line began servicing Central on 23 May 1986 when it was extended beyond Admiralty to Sheung Wan and the Island line platforms came into service.

Passageway to Hong Kong station
One component of the Airport Core Programme between 1991 and 1998 was a railway connecting the new Hong Kong International Airport to the city centre. To link Central with the nearby Hong Kong station, the southern terminus of the Tung Chung line and the Airport Express, a passageway was built under Connaught Road to connect the two stations. The passageway starts at the Pedder Street concourse and was built with a design similar to that of Hong Kong station. The passage connects the paid areas of both stations (particularly from Central to the Tung Chung line of Hong Kong station).  There is no unpaid link (though access to the Airport Express line at Hong Kong station from other lines at Central or vice versa requires an out-of-system transfer as the Airport Express line follows a separate fare scheme from the rest of the MTR system).

Station layout

Central station has four platforms on three levels.

The top level includes platform 3 and is built beneath Des Voeux Road Central at the intersection of Pedder Street, stretching from World-Wide House to Alexandra House, on the northern side of the road. The platform serves Chai Wan-bound trains on the Island line and this level includes the connecting walkway to Hong Kong station.

The middle level includes platforms 1 and 2 using a shared island. They serve the Tsuen Wan line and were built directly under Chater Road, extending from Des Voeux Road Central to Club Street.

The bottom level, two levels from the top level, is platform 4, for Island line trains in the direction of Kennedy Town.

Passengers from platform 3 transferring to platforms 1 or 2 use the regular escalators on the Chater Road concourse. There are designated escalators from platforms 1 and 2 to platform 4 for the sole purpose of transfer.

The Tsuen Wan line platforms are straight and were built by cut-and-cover. Most of the length of the Island line platforms is the same, although the eastern part (towards ) is curved and the gap is large, as they are located in sections of bored tunnels and have the curved walls typical of most other stations on the Island line.

Entrances and exits
Central station stretches underneath Chater Road from Statue Square in the east and underneath Des Voeux Road to Li Yuen Street East in the west. The distance between the easternmost and westernmost exits is approximately 700m. There are 13 entrances, connecting buildings, shopping malls, main roads and ground transport facilities nearby.

 Pedder Street Concourse
A : Connaught Road Central, Central Pier
B: World-wide House, Hang Seng Bank Headquarters
C: Li Yuen Street (East & West)
D1: Pedder Street
D2: Queens Road Central, Lan Kwai Fong

 Chater Road Concourse
E: Chater House
F: St George's Building, Mandarin Oriental Hotel
G: The Landmark
H: Alexandra House
J1: Court of Final Appeal
J2: Chater Garden, Bank of China Tower, Peak Tram station, Cheung Kong Center
J3: AIA Central, Bank of America Tower
K: Statue Square, HSBC Main Building, Standard Chartered Bank Building
L : CCB Tower

Transport connections
Central station is one of the transport hubs of Hong Kong. The area around Central station and Hong Kong station offers a wide range of transport options, including the tramway, buses, ferries, minibuses and more. (See also Transport in Hong Kong)
 Bus
 Citybus
 KMB, serving only cross-harbour routes on Hong Kong Island
 New World First Bus
 Nearby bus termini:
 Central Piers Bus Terminus (exit A or E then via footbridge, of within paid area via Hong Kong station)
 City Hall Bus Terminus (exit K then via tunnel)
 Exchange Square Bus Terminus (exit A then via footbridge, or within paid area via Hong Kong station)
 Minibus
 Trams
 Hong Kong Tramways (exits B, C, G and K)
 Peak Tram (exit J2)
 Ferries (exit A to Central Ferry Piers)
 Pier 2: Park Island Ferry, to Park Island
 Pier 3: Discovery Bay Ferry, to Discovery Bay
 Pier 4: Hong Kong & Kowloon Ferry, to Sok Kwu Wan and Yung Shue Wan on Lamma Island
 Piers 5 and 6: Sun Ferry, to Silvermine Bay (Mui Wo), Peng Chau and Cheung Chau
 Pier 7: Star Ferry, to Tsim Sha Tsui

References

Central, Hong Kong
MTR stations on Hong Kong Island
Tsuen Wan line
Island line (MTR)
Railway stations in Hong Kong opened in 1980